Tatev Hakobyan (born 21 March 1996) is an Armenian weightlifter. She won the bronze medal in the women's 90kg event at the 2017 European Weightlifting Championships held in Split, Croatia.

In 2018, she competed in the women's 81 kg event at the World Weightlifting Championships held in Ashgabat, Turkmenistan where she failed to register a successful result in the Snatch event.

In 2019, she won the silver medal in the under-23 women's 87kg event at the European Junior & U23 Weightlifting Championships in Bucharest, Romania. In that same year, she also won the gold medal in the women's 87kg event at the 6th International Qatar Cup held in Doha, Qatar.

She finished in 5th place in the women's 81 kg event at the 2021 World Weightlifting Championships held in Tashkent, Uzbekistan.

References

External links 
 

Living people
1996 births
Place of birth missing (living people)
Armenian female weightlifters
European Weightlifting Championships medalists
21st-century Armenian women